Solomon Islands Sign Language is the local deaf sign language of the Solomon Islands. There are significant similarities between the sign of the main islands of Guadalcanal and Malaita, and presumably elsewhere. The capital Honiara, where deaf people from all nine provinces have gathered, has the most developed Deaf community, and there is a nearby Deaf village at Aruliho. SISL is all domains of life, with admixture of Signed English and Auslan signs.

There is a relatively high incidence of deafness in the Solomon Islands due to poverty-related diseases such  malaria, meningitis, rubella, and otitis media. Attitude towards SISL is very positive, and the community worries that Auslan, which is taught at school, does not reflect their cultural and language needs. This has been confirmed by a pilot linguistic investigation.

References

Sign language isolates
Languages of the Solomon Islands